Francis Elliott Drouet (1907–1982) was an American phycologist, who collected specimens in the United States, Brazil, Mexico, and Panama.

Biography
Francis Drouet grew up in Independence, Missouri. After graduating from the University of Missouri with BA and MA in botany, he received there his PhD in botany in 1931. His publications from 1930 to 1936 deal with both flowering plants and blue-green algae (cyanophytes), but his later papers and books are almost exclusively on blue-green algae. He worked as a herbarium assistant at the University of Missouri until 1935. From 1935 to 1936 he was employed as a botanist in a one-year fish culture programme sponsored by the Brazilian government. From 1936 to 1939 he studied botany at Yale University on a Seessel fellowship. From 1939 to 1958 he was the curator of cryptogams at Chicago's Field Museum of Natural History.

At the Academy of Natural Sciences of Philadelphia, he was a research fellow and curator of the algal herbarium from 1961 until his retirement in 1975. He is known primarily for his taxonomic revisions of several families of Cyanobacteria (blue-green algae). He wrote a five-volume monograph series on the blue-green algae. His cyanophyte collection is curated in the botany department of the Smithsonian Institution.

Selected publications

References

External links

1907 births
1982 deaths
American phycologists
20th-century American botanists
University of Missouri alumni
People associated with the Field Museum of Natural History